Burnside West Christchurch University Cricket Club or BWCUCC is a cricket club that plays at Burnside Park, Christchurch, Canterbury, New Zealand. It is one of the oldest cricket clubs in Christchurch, having been established in 1905.

As of the start of the 2016/17 season the club has 11 adult teams which play in several grades in the Christchurch Metropolitan Cricket Association. The club also has 10 junior Saturday teams in the Christchurch Junior Cricket Association leagues. They also have a very well supported Friday night league for younger cricketers (school years 1–3) who are just being introduced to the game.

While the club has benefited from several mergers over the years from the West Christchurch Cricket Club, which then merged with University Cricket who were at Ilam Fields, Christchurch, and then subsequently they merged with Burnside Cricket to form the new club and to further establish Burnside Park, or as cricketers would call it, Burnside Oval.

BWCUCC has had several players represent both the provincial team of Canterbury cricket team and internationally with the New Zealand national cricket team

History of the Club 
The first meeting of the West Christchurch club was held on 31 August 1905 at Municipal Chambers Building on the corner of Worcester Street and Oxford Terrace, presided over by Canon Hare. The colours of the club were registered as dark and light blue, and the crest was the rampant lion with the raised tail that is still part of the present club's emblem.

Notable players 

 Tom Latham
 George Worker
 Justin Boyle
 David Farrant
 Anthony Farrant
 Brian Hastings
 Graham Dowling
 Peter Sharp
 Arthur Donnelly
 Martin Donnelly
 Jack Kerr
 Dan Reese
 Roger Blunt
 Harold Lusk
 Gary Bartlett
 Sammy Guillen
 David Trist
 Terry Jarvis

Club Patrons 
 1906-07 Canon Hare
 1907-34 Sir Henry Wigram
 1934-35 Lady Wigram
 1935-54 Sir Arthur Donnelly
 1954-61 WS MacGibbon
 1961-62 Prof FLlewellyn
 1962-66 Dr LL Pownall
 1967-77 Prof NC Phillips
 1977-05 Jack Kerr
 2005-15 Graham Dowling
 2015-   Grant Dickson

References

Sport in Christchurch
New Zealand club cricket teams